Reda El Amrani (born 19 May 1988) is a professional tennis player from Morocco. He has a career high-ranking of world No. 160 achieved in June 2010.

Career finals: 19 (13–6)

Singles: 11 (8–3)

Doubles: 8 (5–3)

Style of play
Reda El Amrani has a powerful serve, he can easily reach . He usually hits approximately 10 aces per match. He sometimes hits a lot of double faults. He has a good forehand, as he hits it spinny most of the time but sometimes flat; he won this way against 2 top 100 players. He has a one handed backhand. He also uses a lot of dropshots. He has had numerous injuries, like a knee injury in 2011.

Best results

2010

250 Series: Quarter-finalist Grand Prix Hassan II (Casablanca).

Challenger Series: Finalist Rome-3, Finalist Bogotá-2, Semi-Finalist Alessandria, Quarter-finalist Blumenau.

2009

Futures Series: Winner: Nigeria F2, Nigeria F1, Morocco F3, Tunisia F2, Tunisia F1.

2008

Futures Series: Winner: Italy F29, Egypt F4, Tunisia F1, Tunisia F2.

2007

Futures Series: Winner: Tunisia F2.

External links
 
 

1988 births
Living people
Moroccan male tennis players
Sportspeople from Casablanca